Greater Somalia (As-Sūmal al-Kubra) is a concept to unite all ethnic Somalis comprising the regions in or near the Horn of Africa in which ethnic Somalis live and have historically inhabited. The territory historically encompassed British Jubaland Province (now Jubaland), British Somali Coast Protectorate (now internationally unrecognized Somaliland), Italian Somaliland, French Somaliland (now Djibouti), the Somali Region in Ethiopia, the Northern Frontier District in Kenya, and the intra-46th meridian east territories. At the present, it encompasses Somalia proper, Jubaland, southern Djibouti, the Somali Region and Dire Dawa in Ethiopia, and the Garissa, Wajir and Mandera Counties in Kenya (all of which were part of the former North Eastern Province which was abolished in 2013).

History 

Since the beginning of the 20th century the concept of Greater Somalia started to be developed with the birth of the nation of Somalia, as a united country inhabited by all the Somalis in their "Horn of Africa" areas. Pan-Somalism refers to the vision of reunifying these areas to form a single Somali nation. The pursuit of this goal has led to conflict: Somalia engaged after World War II in the Ogaden War with Ethiopia over the Somali Region, and supported Somali insurgents against Kenya. In 1946 the Somali Youth League selected Harar as the future capital of Greater Somalia and subsequently sent delegates to the United Nations office in Mogadishu to reveal this proposal.

Italian Somalia
Italians occupied the Benadir in 1890 and soon started to enlarge their Somalia italiana (Italian Somaliland): they created their colony in the first years of the 20th century.

During World War I, Britain secretly reached an agreement with Italy to transfer to the Italians 94,050 square kilometers of the Jubaland protectorate, which was situated in present-day southwestern Somalia. This was Italy's reward for allying itself with Britain in its war against Germany. The treaty was honored, and in 1924, Britain ceded Jubaland. 

In 1926, the northern half of Jubaland was incorporated into Italian Somaliland, and was later re-dubbed Oltre Giuba by the Italians. Britain retained control of the southern half of the partitioned Jubaland territory, which was later called the Northern Frontier District (NFD).

After its conquest of Ethiopia in 1936, Italy also annexed the Huwan region. In this way Italian Somaliland, with capital Mogadishu, was enlarged once more.

In early World War II, Italian troops invaded British Somaliland and ejected the British. Benito Mussolini annexed the conquered area to the Italian Somalia and added even the area of Moyale and Buna near the Jubaland in eastern Kenya. In August 1940 Mussolini boasted to a group of Somalis in Rome that with the conquest of British Somalia (that he annexed to Italian Somalia) nearly all the Somali people were united, fulfilling their dream of a union of all Somalis.  In September 1940 he even announced to the Somali people in Italy of having created an Italian Grande Somalia inside his Italian Empire.

Indeed, in early World War II, Italian troops invaded British Somaliland and ejected the British. However, Britain retained administration of most of the almost exclusively Somali-inhabited Northern Frontier District. Italians even did a tentative  to occupy French Somaliland in summer 1940.

However the British regained control of British Somaliland in the spring of 1941, and conquered Italian Somaliland and the Somali Region. In 1945, the Potsdam conference was held, where it was decided not to return Italian Somaliland to Italy. The UN opted instead in 1949 to grant Italy trusteeship of Italian Somaliland for a period of ten years, after which time the region would be independent.

Meanwhile, in 1948, under pressure from their World War II allies and to the dismay of Somalis, the British "returned" the Haud (an important Somali grazing area that was presumably "protected" by British treaties with the Somalis in 1884 and 1886) and the Somali Region to Ethiopia, based on a treaty they signed in 1897 in which the British ceded Somali territory to the Ethiopian Emperor Menelik in exchange for his help against raids by Somali clans. Britain included the proviso that the Somali residents would retain their autonomy, but Ethiopia immediately claimed sovereignty over the area. This prompted an unsuccessful bid by Britain in 1956 to buy back the Somali lands that it had turned over. Britain also granted administration of the almost exclusively Somali-inhabited Northern Frontier District to Kenyan nationalists despite an informal plebiscite demonstrating the overwhelming desire of the region's population to join the newly formed Somali Republic.

Somali Republic

The first armed conflict following the independence and unification of the former British Somaliland and Italian Somaliland territories, known collectively as the Somali Republic, began in 1963 in an ethnic Oromo and Somali district, Elekere, then part of Bale province, instigated by the Oromo founder of the United Liberation Forces of Oromia, Waqo Gutu. The Bale revolt, a peasant revolt stemming from issues involving land, taxation, class, and religion, raged in the province for several years until a number of developments took the energy out of the militants, as well as the decision of Somali Prime Minister Muhammad Haji Ibrahim Egal to focus his country's resources on economic development. Rebels began to surrender to the Ethiopian government at the end of 1969; Waqo Gutu, who had been the foremost of the insurgents, was surrounded with his command of barely 200 men in Arana by the Ethiopian army in February 1970 and surrendered. Pacification was complete by the next year.

Djibouti gained its independence in 1977, but a referendum was held in 1958 on the eve of Somalia's independence in 1960 to decide whether or not to join the Somali Republic or to remain with France. The referendum turned out in favor of a continued association with France, largely due to a combined "yes" vote by the sizable Afar ethnic group and resident Europeans. However, the majority of those who voted "no" were Somalis who were strongly in favor of joining a united Somalia as had been proposed by Mahmoud Harbi. Harbi was killed in a plane crash two years later, and Hassan Gouled Aptidon, a Somali who campaigned for a yes vote in the referendum of 1958, wound up as Djibouti's first president post-independence (1977–1991).

Between 1977 and 1978, Somalia and Ethiopia waged a war over control of the predominantly Somali Ogaden region. In 1978 and with the help of Soviet and Cuban troops, Ethiopian troops drove back the Somali army from the Ogaden, effectively marking the end of the Ogaden War.

In 1981, Siad Barre visited Nairobi, and asserted that Somalia was suspending its claim on the North Eastern Province (NFD). Improved relations with Kenya led to the signing of a pact in December 1984 agreeing to cease hostilities along the border.

Following renewed hostilities in the Ogaden with an August 1982 border clash, Ethiopia and Somalia signed a peace treaty in 1988.

Somali Civil War 

With the start of the Somali Civil War, the vision of uniting the various historically and predominantly Somali-inhabited areas of the Horn of Africa into a Greater Somalia was temporarily sidelined. Thousands of refugees have been granted political asylum in Kenya. Talk of pan-Somali unification movements for the moment took a backseat, as the Republic splintered into a few autonomous smaller regional or clan-based governing zones. The northern regions of the Somali Republic, which previously was a British protectorate, declared independence as the Republic of Somaliland in 1991, shattering the dream of a greater Somalia now that the two regions that previously united split apart. Though there was no unified government and thus no formal policy towards irredentism, individual militia leaders clashed with Ethiopian troops between 1998 and 2000.

Islamic Courts Union 
In late 2006, Sheikh Hassan Dahir Aweys, head of the Islamic Courts Union (ICU) that then controlled much of southern Somalia, declared, "We will leave no stone unturned to integrate our Somali brothers in Kenya and Ethiopia and restore their freedom to live with their ancestors in Somalia." These aims were sidelined after the decisive defeat of the ICU in the Battle of Baidoa and the subsequent actions of the War in Somalia by the allied forces of the Somali Transitional Federal Government (TFG), the autonomous governing zones of Puntland, Southwestern Somalia, Jubaland, and Galmudug and their military backer, Ethiopia. The Islamic Courts split into two factions. One faction wanted to sign a peace deal and merge with the TFG, while the other sought to defeat the Ethiopian troops and expel the African Union soldiers before any peace agreements.

See also 

 North Eastern Province
 Pan-nationalism
 Irredentism
 Ethnic nationalism

References

Further reading 
 Pierre Petrides, The Boundary Question between Ethiopia and Somalia. New Delhi, 1983.

External links 
 Somalia-Ethiopia, Kenya Conflict
 Somalia Online News and Discussions

Historical regions
Horn of Africa
Foreign relations of Ethiopia
Geography of Somalia
Somalia
Politics of Somalia
Somali nationalism
Somalia